Dalla ligilla is a species of butterfly in the family Hesperiidae. It is found in Mexico.

References

Butterflies described in 1877
ligilla
Butterflies of North America
Taxa named by William Chapman Hewitson